Algernon Coote, 6th Earl of Mountrath PC (Ire) (6 June 1689 – 27 August 1744), styled The Honourable Algernon Coote until 1720, was an Anglo-Irish peer who sat as a Member of Parliament in the Parliament of Ireland as well as in the Parliament of Great Britain.

Coote was the third son of Charles Coote, 3rd Earl of Mountrath (1655–1709). He was educated at St Paul's School and Trinity College, Cambridge, where he matriculated in 1706. Coote was elected to the Irish House of Commons for Jamestown in 1715. His elder brothers, Charles and Henry, both succeeded to the earldom before him but died unmarried. Coote succeeded in his turn on 27 March 1720 and ascended to the Irish House of Lords.

Mountrath was appointed to the Privy Council of Ireland in 1723. As his earldom was also Irish, it did not disqualify him from sitting in the British House of Commons, and he entered Parliament in the same year as member for Castle Rising in Norfolk, which he represented for ten years. He also became Governor of Queen's County.

In 1741 he stood for Parliament again at Hedon in Yorkshire, and was initially declared defeated. However, on petition to the House of Commons (in those days the normal procedure in a disputed election), the result was overturned and on 4 March 1742 Mountrath was declared elected after all. He sat as member for the borough for the remaining two years of his life.

In 1721 he married Lady Diana Newport (d. 1766), daughter of the 2nd Earl of Bradford. Horace Walpole described her as being "as rich and as tipsy as Cacofogo in the comedy. What a jumble of avarice, lewdness, dignity – and claret!". They had only one child, Charles (c. 1725–1802), who succeeded to the earldom on Mountrath's death in 1744, but who died unmarried, the title thereby becoming extinct.

References
Henry Stooks Smith, "The Parliaments of England from 1715 to 1847" (2nd edition, edited by FWS Craig – Chichester: Parliamentary Reference Publications, 1973)
 
Coote genealogy

1689 births
1744 deaths
Coote, Algernon
Members of the Parliament of Great Britain for English constituencies
Coote, Algernon
Members of the Privy Council of Ireland
Algernon
British MPs 1722–1727
British MPs 1727–1734
British MPs 1741–1747
Earls of Mountrath